We Will Meet Again is an album by jazz pianist Bill Evans made for Warner Bros. Records in 1979. It is notable in that it is Evans's last studio recording.

After the suicide of Bill Evans' older brother, Harry, earlier in 1979, Bill made this album with his brother in mind, "We Will Meet Again" is addressed to Harry.

Just after Harry's suicide, Bill Evans started a relationship with a Canadian waitress named Laurie Verchomin, the track "Laurie" is named after her. Laurie eventually took care of Bill Evans until his death, she was the last person he saw before he died.

Reception
At the Grammy Awards of 1981, I Will Say Goodbye won the Grammy Award for Best Jazz Instrumental Solo and We Will Meet Again won the Best Instrumental Jazz Performance, Group awards.

The Allmusic review awarded the album 4 stars.

Track listing
All tracks by Bill Evans except where noted.

 "Comrade Conrad" – 10:05
 "Laurie" – 8:20
 "Bill's Hit Tune" – 10:49
 "For All We Know (We May Never Meet Again)" (J. Fred Coots, Sam M. Lewis) – 3:37
 "Five" – 9:10
 "Only Child" – 10:47
 "Peri's Scope" – 6:11
 "We Will Meet Again" – 2:34

Personnel
Credits adapted from AllMusic.
Bill Evans – acoustic piano, electric piano
Tom Harrell – trumpet
Marc Johnson – bass
Joe LaBarbera – drums
Larry Schneider – tenor saxophone, soprano saxophone, alto flute

Production
Helen Keane – producer
Frank Laico – engineer, mixing
Aram Gesar – photography
Stew Romaine – mastering
Chris Callis – photography
Lee Herschberg – digital mastering (CD reissue)

Charts

Discography

References

External links
The Bill Evans Memorial Library

Bill Evans albums
1979 albums
Warner Records albums
Grammy Award for Best Jazz Instrumental Album
Albums recorded at CBS 30th Street Studio